Hovnan is an Armenian given name. Notable people with the name include:

 Hovnan Derderian (born 1957), Armenian cleric
 Hovnan Mayravanetsi ( 572–650), Armenian theologian and philosopher

See also
 Hovnatanian

Armenian masculine given names